STS-61-G was a NASA Space Shuttle mission planned to launch on 20 May 1986, using Atlantis. The main objective of this mission was to launch the Galileo spacecraft toward Jupiter using the Centaur-G upper stage. It was canceled after the Challenger disaster.

Crew

Crew notes 
John M. Fabian was scheduled to fly as Mission Specialist 1 on his third trip to space, but he took advice from his wife who had earlier told him that "his marriage had a two-flight limit", he soon resigned from this mission. His replacement was Norman E. Thagard. Most of the crew sans van Hoften flew on STS-30 in May 1989, with Mary L. Cleave taking the place of van Hoften and the addition of rookie Mark C. Lee. Galileo was launched on STS-34 in October 1989, using the Inertial Upper Stage (IUS) booster instead of the Centaur-G (which was canceled in 1986).

See also 

 Canceled Space Shuttle missions
 STS-30
 STS-34

References 

Cancelled Space Shuttle missions